Nir Eyal is an Israeli-born American author, lecturer, and investor known for his bestselling book, Hooked: How to Build Habit-Forming Products.

Biography
Nir Eyal was born on February 19, 1980, in Hadera, Israel. When he was three, his family immigrated to the United States and settled in a suburb of Orlando, Florida. He earned a B.A. at Emory University in 2001. He then worked for Boston Consulting Group and a solar panel installation firm before attending Stanford for his MBA.

Academic and literary career
After graduating from the Master of Business Administration program at Stanford in 2008, Eyal and fellow students founded a company that placed online ads in Facebook, with Eyal serving as CEO. His work in the company sparked his interest in the psychology of users, and he went on to become a consultant in product design. In 2012, he taught a course in the program on product design at the Stanford University School of Engineering.

Eyal's expertise is in behavioral engineering, which incorporates elements of behavioral science to enable software designers to develop habit-forming products for businesses. He has taught university courses, given speeches, and published books about the intersection of psychology and technology, and business. His writing has appeared in Fast Company, Harvard Business Review, The Atlantic, Psychology Today and other publications.

In 2014 Eyal published his first book, Hooked: How to Build Habit-Forming Products, which became a Wall Street Journal best seller. The title reflects Eyal's idea of the "hooked model", which aims to "build products that create habit-forming behavior in users via a looping cycle that consists of a trigger, an action, a variable reward, and continued investment."

His second book, Indistractable: How to Control Your Attention and Choose Your Life, was written with Julie Li and published in September 2019.

Eyal has spoken out against proposals to regulate habit-forming technologies, arguing that it is an individual user's responsibility to control their own use of such products.

In March 2020, he wrote an article for The New York Times titled "Home-Schooling Tweens and Teens During Coronavirus Closings."

Published works

References

External links
 

Living people
21st-century American non-fiction writers
Israeli Jews
Year of birth missing (living people)